Looking for Adventure is the third studio album by Eddie and the Tide, released by Atco in 1987. It was the band's second and final album for a major label. The album received its first CD release in 2009 by Wounded Bird Records.

"Weak in the Presence of Beauty" and "Waiting for the One" were released as singles. The music video for "Weak in the Presence of Beauty" was directed by John Jopson and "Waiting for the One" directed by Rodney McDonald.

Reception

Upon release, Billboard described the album as "very strong". They noted the "anthemic" "This Life of Ours", the slower "Stand a Little Rain" and lead single "Weak in the Presence of Beauty". Jack Kraft of The Morning Call felt the album contained "several good pop-rock dance tunes" such as "Waiting for the One" and "If You Want to Rock". He concluded: "Looking for Adventure shows why Eddie Rice & Co are a popular club band. It may also go a long way in helping translate that popularity into chart success."

Track listing

Personnel
Eddie and the Tide
 Eddie Rice - lead vocals, rhythm guitar, arranger
 Johnny Perri - lead guitar, backing vocals, arranger
 Chris Rieger - keyboards, arranger
 George Diebold - bass, arranger
 Scott Mason - drums, backing vocals, arranger

Production
 Bobby Corona - producer (tracks 1-3, 5-7, 10)
 Keith Olsen - producer (track 4)
 B. A. Robertson - producer (tracks 8-9)
 Dave Luke, Guy Roche, Wally Buck - engineers
 Brian McGee - mixing (tracks 1-3, 6, 8-10)
 Brian Foraker - mixing (track 4)
 Tom Size - mixing (tracks 5, 7), engineer
 Greg Fulginetti - mastering

Other
 Bob Defrin - art direction
 Billy Douglas, Pat Johnson - photography

References

1987 albums
Atco Records albums